Mark Bos (born 28 July 1960) is a former Australian rules footballer who played for Geelong in the Victorian Football League (VFL) during the 1980s.

Bos made his senior VFL debut during the 1979 VFL season, and playing on the half back flank, won consecutive Carji Greeves Medals for Geelong's Best and Fairest in 1987 and 1988.

He retired at the end of the 1989 VFL season at the relatively young age of 29 to pursue interests beyond football.

References

Holmesby, Russell and Main, Jim (2007). The Encyclopedia of AFL Footballers. 7th ed. Melbourne: Bas Publishing.

1960 births
Living people
Australian rules footballers from Victoria (Australia)
Geelong Football Club players
Carji Greeves Medal winners
Victorian State of Origin players